Nicky Stanton (born 18 March 1989) is an English professional rugby league footballer who has played in the 2000s and 2010s. He has played at representative level for England (Academy), and at club level for the Wigan Warriors (Senior Academy, and first-team squad member No. 26 in 2008's Super League XIII) and in National League One for the Leigh Centurions (Heritage No. 1313) as an occasional goal-kicking .

Background
Nicky Stanton was born in Wigan, Greater Manchester, England.

Playing career
Stanton has originally a footballing background and was snapped up to play rugby. He started his career in the Wigan Warriors Junior Academy in 2006 making eleven appearances and scoring six tries. The following season he was promoted to the Senior Academy and began an impressive academy career. In 2007 he made twenty-one appearances for the Senior Academy and four appearances for the Junior Academy he scored a total of seventeen tries, sixteen tries in the Senior Academy and one in the Junior Academy.

Stanton was also discovered to be a very talented goal kicker and was made the first choice goal kicker for the Senior Academy scoring sixty-eight goals as long with another thirteen goals scored in the Junior Academy. In 2008 he was promoted to the Wigan Warriors first team and given the squad number 26 although he never played in any first team matches. He continued to play in the top grade of the academy system (which became the Reserves League in 2008); he played ten games scoring eight tries and kicking sixty goals.

Stanton was not able to break into the first team in 2008 due to wingers Pat Richards, Mark Calderwood and Liam Colbon all being picked ahead of him. The signing of utility player Cameron Phelps meant his chances were even more limited. He was released from Wigan by mutual consent at the end of 2008 to pursue first team rugby with National League One side Leigh Centurions.

References

1989 births
Living people
English rugby league players
Leigh Leopards players
Rugby league players from Wigan
Wigan Warriors players